Rosanne Haggerty (born 1961) is an American housing and community development leader, and founder of Common Ground Community and later of Community Solutions. Haggerty redeveloped the Times Square Hotel, a building on the National Register of Historic Places, reducing homelessness by 87 percent in the 20-block neighborhood around it.

Haggerty attended Amherst College for a bachelor's in American studies, Columbia University's Graduate School of Architecture, Planning and Preservation for a Master of Architecture, and is a PhD student in sociology at New York University.

She was an Adelaide Thinker in Residence in Adelaide, Australia. South Australian Premier Mike Rann and Social Inclusion Commissioner David Cappo backed Haggerty's recommendations with a multimillion-dollar investment in inner-city apartment buildings tailor-made for homeless people, establishing Common Ground Adelaide and Street to Home.

Awards and honors
1998 Peter Drucker Award
2001 MacArthur Fellows Program
2003 Honorary Doctorate from Amherst College
2007 Ashoka Fellowship
2008 Goto Shimpei Award
2012 Jane Jacobs Medal for New Ideas and Activism 
2015 Schwab Foundation Social Entrepreneur
2015 Design Mind by the Cooper Hewitt, Smithsonian Design Museum’s National Design Award
2017 Honorary Doctor of Humane Letters from Emmanuel College (Massachusetts)
2017 John W. Gardner Leadership Award

References
Notes

External links
"An interview with Rosanne Haggerty of Common Ground Community". Shelterforce, Issue #125, September/October 2002
"Q&A: Why Houses Cost Less Than Homelessness", Good, Kyla Fullenwider, February 9, 2010

1961 births
Amherst College alumni
Ashoka USA Fellows
Columbia Graduate School of Architecture, Planning and Preservation alumni
Homelessness activists
Living people
MacArthur Fellows